Nina Dmitriyevna Umanets (born 1 May 1956 in Tulchyn Raion, Vinnytsia Oblast) is a Ukrainian rower. She competed in the women's eight for the Soviet Union at the 1980 Summer Olympics where she won the silver medal. Umanets also won five gold medals at the World Rowing Championships.

In 2014, she worked as Deputy Minister of Sports of Ukraine with Dmytro Bulatov.

References 

1956 births
Living people
Russian female rowers
Soviet female rowers
Rowers at the 1980 Summer Olympics
Olympic silver medalists for the Soviet Union
Olympic rowers of the Soviet Union
Olympic medalists in rowing
People from Vinnytsia Oblast
World Rowing Championships medalists for the Soviet Union
Medalists at the 1980 Summer Olympics